Roadside Poppies are an English indie pop band, formed in Cambridge, England, in 2006, by Matloob Qureshi. They played the Kaninkanon V Festival in Copenhagen, Denmark, on 15 September 2007. They appeared at the Copenhagen Popfest, Copenhagen, Denmark, on 18 April 2010.

History
Core band members Qureshi and White first met in the context of the Cambridge music scene. Qureshi invited White to join the fledgling outfit after White's previous band, Colonel Bastard, folded in 2006. Roadside Poppies released their first EP on Scottish indie label WeePOP! before recording their first album, One Day You Won't Feel A Thing, as part of the 2007 RPM Challenge. After a series of gigs played in Cambridge, Oxford and London, UK, the band undertook their first European tour in the summer of 2007, playing two dates in Denmark and Sweden. They played the Indietracks Festival in Butterley, Derbyshire on 27–28 July 2008. The White-penned single "Cute Susan" was included on the official festival compilation album, issued by Make Do and Mend Records.
 
Roadside Poppies has been subject to a changing line-up. The One Day You Won't Feel A Thing album was written and recorded while key member Martin White was temporarily based in Geneva, Switzerland. The 2007 Scandinavian tour was conducted without singer/violinist Naomi Irvine, who had quit the band earlier that summer. In July 2007, Roadside Poppies announced they were looking for a new female vocalist, and Cambridge-based vocalist Abby Baker was subsequently recruited. In autumn 2007 guitarist Nick left the band and relocated to Manchester, to be replaced by Adam. In January 2008, the band saw the departure of singer/songwriter Qureshi, who relocated to Copenhagen. Qureshi and White continued to collaborate at a distance, writing and recording a second album for the 2008 RPM Challenge, titled Mended Hearts and Broken Bones. The "broken bones" of the album's title refer to a road accident suffered by Qureshi, which occurred at the time of recording the album. By summer 2008, the band had acquired new Copenhagen-based Danish members, including vocalist Lena and guitarist Morten.

Members

Present
 Matloob Qureshi - guitar, bass, vocals, harmonica
 Martin White - vocals, guitar, bass, mandolin
 Duncan Scott - keyboard, melodica
 Nick Peters - guitar, accordion, glockenspiel
 Morten Hougaard - bass
 Line Sandst - vocals and glockenspiel
 Elise Nimand Madsen - vocals and glockenspiel
 Claus Frøhlich - drums
 Kasper Clemmensen - guitar

Previous
 Naomi Irvine - vocals, violin, tambourine
 Abby Baker - vocals
 Adam - guitar, bass
 Mads - guitar

Discography

Albums
One Day You Won't Feel A Thing (2007)
Mended Hearts and Broken Bones (2008)

Singles and EPs
"Live at the Chateau Blanc" (2009)
"Just Another Love Song" (2007)
"An Apology (in the Key of C)" (2007)
"Cycling and Crying" (2007)
"Cute Susan" (Make Do and Mend Records, 2008)

References

External links
 Kaninkanon website

British indie pop groups
English pop music groups
Musical groups established in 2006